Urías is a Hispanic surname that may refer to
Adolfo Urías Mexican singer
Alfonso Quijada Urías (born 1940), Salvadoran poet and author
Carlos Urías (born 1975), Mexican boxer 
Jocelyn Urías (born 1996), Mexican volleyball player
Jorge Urías (born 1992), Mexican football player
Julio Urías (born 1996), Mexican baseball pitcher
Julio César Urías (born 1972), Guatemalan racewalker 
Luis Urías (born 1997), Mexican baseball infielder 
Polo Urías, Mexican singer, uncle of Adolfo
Ramón Urías (born 1994), Mexican baseball player

Spanish-language surnames